Arthur Joseph Herbert Robinson (21 April 1899 – 12 January 1937) was an Irish first-class cricketer.

Robinson was born at Rathmines in April 1899, and was educated at Clongowes Wood College in County Kildare. He entered straight into the British Army as a Second Lieutenant following his schooling, where he served in the latter stages of World War I with the Leinster Regient. Following the war, he studied at Trinity College, Dublin and was a member of Dublin University Cricket Club. He toured England with the university in 1924, playing in one first-class match against Northamptonshire at Rushden. In July 1924, he made his debut for Ireland in a first-class match against Scotland at Dundee. He made five further first-class appearances for Ireland, the last coming in 1929 against Scotland. Playing a total of seven first-class matches, he scored 155 runs at an average of 12.91, with a highest score of 32. Besides playing club cricket in Dublin for Dublin University and Pembroke Cricket Club, his work took him around Ireland, with Robinson also playing for City of Derry and Cork County. He died at Monkstown in January 1937.

References

External links

1899 births
1937 deaths
People from County Dublin
People educated at Clongowes Wood College
Alumni of Trinity College Dublin
Irish cricketers
Dublin University cricketers
British Army personnel of World War I
Prince of Wales's Leinster Regiment officers